Manhattan, AZ is a comedy television show that aired on the USA Network during the Summer of 2000.

Premise
An undercover Los Angeles Vice Cop, Daniel Henderson, loses his loving wife in a bizarre sea accident. While working for Greenpeace cutting dolphins out of tuna nets, she is herself swept up and canned in spring light water.  In his despair he decides to move to Manhattan, AZ along with his son, to become sheriff and start a new life.  Daniel likes the peace and quiet the desert has to offer while Atticus hates its small town ways.  Described by critics as "Andy Griffith on acid," Manhattan, AZ is composed of many colorful characters and Area 61, an eerie Air Force base that officially doesn't exist and is the cause of many mysterious events nearby.  The situations seem over the top but are cut from the headlines of the day.  The hilarious dialogue is delivered deadpan.  The episodes end with one of the actors speaking directly to the audience describing something in the episode with the end line of "We work in Television and we know better than you."

Main characters
  Brian McNamara as Sheriff Daniel Henderson - Sheriff of very small Manhattan, AZ desert town.  Former undercover Los Angeles vice cop.  Former soldier in US Army in Panama.
  Vincent Berry as Atticus Finch Henderson - Son of Sheriff Daniel Henderson.  Named after character from "To Kill A Mocking Bird".  Atticus is portrayed by Chace Paddack during the first half of the episode as a chubby version.  Episodes end with his voiceover that says "This Place Really Sucks".
  Chad Everett as Jake Manahttan - Mayor of his namesake town where he runs the town bar.  He charges "His cost plus ten percent" for everything.  He is a former Hollywood TV star.

Recurring Characters
 Mindy Sterling as Lona, wife of Lon, a pair of sex crazed, gun toting senior citizens.
 Robin Gammell as Lon, husband of Lona.
 Kate Hodge as Jane Pentowski - An Air Force airmen who likes Sheriff Henderson and wears very skimpy outfits while off duty.
 Stephen Tobolowsky as Dr. Bob - The town vet that doubles as the towns medical Doctor.

Episodes

External links
 
 Manhattan, AZ on USA from the TV Guide website
 

2000 American television series debuts
2000 American television series endings
2000s American comic science fiction television series
USA Network original programming
2000s American mystery television series
Television shows set in Arizona